Mueang Maha Sarakham is the capital district (amphoe mueang) of Maha Sarakham province, northeastern Thailand.

Geography
Neighboring districts are (from the south clockwise): Kae Dam, Wapi Pathum, Borabue, Kosum Phisai, and Kantharawichai of Maha Sarakham Province; Khong Chai of Kalasin province; and Changhan, Mueang Roi Et, and Si Somdet of Roi Et province.

History
In 1913 the district name was changed from Uthai Sarakham to Mueang Maha Sarakham.

Administration
The district is divided into 14 sub-districts (tambons), which are further subdivided into 182 villages (mubans). The town (thesaban mueang) Maha Sarakham covers the whole of tambon Talat. The township (thesaban tambon) Waeng Nang includes parts of tambon Waeng Nang. There are a further 13 tambon administrative organizations (TAO).

References

Mueang Maha Sarakham